Margot Flemming (born December 9, 1993) is a Canadian curler from Yellowknife, Northwest Territories. She currently plays third on Team Kerry Galusha.

Career
While in juniors, Flemming played third for Kendall Haymes. Despite not winning a provincial junior title, the team did win the U18 Ontario Curling Championships in 2010 with second Cassie Savage and lead Megan Arnold.

Flemming and her team skipped by Shannon Jay qualified for the 2015 Ontario Scotties Tournament of Hearts by winning their regional qualifier. At the provincial championship, the team finished in ninth place with a 3–6 round robin record. The following season, Flemming left the Jay rink and joined Team Kerry Lackie. On the tour, the team missed the playoffs in all three of their events. They weren't able to qualify for the 2016 Ontario Scotties Tournament of Hearts either, losing out in their regional qualifier.

After taking a season off, Flemming joined the Susan Froud rink for the 2017–18 season. The team had a very successful season on tour, qualifying for the playoffs in six of their eight events, including a win at the Stroud Sleeman Cash Spiel. They reached the final of the Biosteel Oakville Fall Classic and the KW Fall Classic, semifinals of the Listowel Women's Classic and the US Open of Curling and the quarterfinals of the NAVY Fall Classic Open Bonspiel. Despite their successful season on tour, the team was unable to qualify for the 2018 Ontario Scotties Tournament of Hearts. The following season, Team Froud only qualified in two of their seven events and did not win any titles. They also competed in the 2018 Tour Challenge Tier 2 event, losing in a tiebreaker to Kelsey Rocque. They were able to qualify for the 2019 Ontario Scotties Tournament of Hearts, however, they finished in seventh place with a 2–5 record. After failing to make it to the 2020 Ontario Scotties Tournament of Hearts, Flemming moved to the Northwest Territories and joined the Kerry Galusha rink as their second.

During the abbreviated 2020–21 season, Team Galusha won the 2021 Northwest Territories Scotties Tournament of Hearts and qualified for the 2021 Scotties Tournament of Hearts, Flemming's first national competition. The Tournament of Hearts was held in a bio-secure "bubble" to prevent spread of the COVID-19 virus. Team Galusha finished the round robin with a 4–4 record, just missing the championship pool.

Team Galusha had a great start to the 2021–22 season, beginning with the Stu Sells Oakville Tankard where they lost in the final to Team Hollie Duncan. The following week, they won the KW Fall Classic after defeating the Duncan rink in the championship game. Due to the COVID-19 pandemic in Canada, the qualification process for the 2021 Canadian Olympic Curling Trials had to be modified to qualify enough teams for the championship. In these modifications, Curling Canada created the 2021 Canadian Curling Pre-Trials Direct-Entry Event, an event where eight teams would compete to try to earn one of two spots into the 2021 Canadian Olympic Curling Pre-Trials. Team Galusha qualified for the Pre-Trials Direct-Entry Event as the fourth seed. The team qualified for the playoffs by going 3–0 in the A Event and then defeated Team Robyn Silvernagle (skipped by Jessie Hunkin) 10–8 to earn the first spot in the Pre-Trials. The next month, the team competed in the Pre-Trials where they finished with a 1–5 record, only beating Team Penny Barker. The 2022 Northwest Territories Scotties Tournament of Hearts was cancelled due to the pandemic and Team Galusha were selected to represent the Territories at the national women's championship. At the 2022 Scotties Tournament of Hearts, the team finished the round robin with a 5–3 record, qualifying them for a tiebreaker against Manitoba's Mackenzie Zacharias. Team Galusha won the tiebreaker 8–6, earning themselves a spot in the playoffs and becoming the first team solely representing the Northwest Territories to qualify for the playoffs in Scotties history. They then lost in the first game of the playoff round to New Brunswick's Andrea Crawford and were eliminated from contention.

Flemming represented the Northwest Territories at the 2021 Canadian Mixed Curling Championship playing third for Jamie Koe. The team finished 9–1 through the round robin and championship pools. They then dropped the semifinal to Quebec before claiming the bronze medal with a victory over New Brunswick.

Personal life
Flemming is currently a PhD student at the University of Waterloo, studying geography. She is in a relationship with Dylan Price.

Teams

References

External links

1993 births
Canadian women curlers
Living people
Curlers from Ontario
Curlers from the Northwest Territories
Sportspeople from Waterloo, Ontario  
Sportspeople from Yellowknife
University of Waterloo alumni
20th-century Canadian women
21st-century Canadian women